Chambermaid is an EP by Emilie Autumn, released in 2001 by Seraph Records. Originally intended as a single from her album Enchant, Autumn has said she considers it to be an EP because she "packed so much material onto it". Most tracks were also subsequently released on different albums; "What If (Blackbird Mix)" appears as "What If (Celtic Mix)" on A Bit o' This & That. "Chambermaid (Decomposition Mix)" is the only track not found anywhere else.

Lyrics
In an interview, Autumn described the song "Chambermaid" as a "fantastic drama" she made up, saying, "the song is not necessarily about me as I have never been the neglected and venomous woman that personifies the main character, but I have an overactive imagination and can easily conjure any number of spirits for inspiration."

Track listing

References

Emilie Autumn albums
2001 EPs